The flag of Aargau was adopted in 1803 by Samuel Ringier-Seelmatter. 

The flag is divided into two parts:
 The left side is black with a central wavy band. This symbolises the fertile grounds of Aargau, through which flows the Aare, the Reuss, and the Limmat.
 The right side is light blue with three five-pointed stars. This symbolizes the three major regions that make up the Canton: County of Baden, Fricktal and The Free Bailies.

External links

Flags of Switzerland
Flag
Flags introduced in 1803